Comarruga (or Coma-ruga) is a seaside resort in the municipality of El Vendrell, in the province of Tarragona (Catalonia, Spain). It stretches along the 2.3 km long Beach of Comarruga. Until 1946 it made part of the former municipality of Sant Vicenç de Calders.

Location 
Comarruga is located in the eastern part of the Costa Dorada, some 55 km to the West of Barcelona-El Prat Airport, near the popular tourist resorts of Calafell and Torredembarra. Developed in the 1950s and 1960s, Comarruga has become a popular tourist destination, particularly for families. A fine beach of golden sand stretching along more than 2 km is its main attraction.

Climate 
Comarruga has a Typical Mediterranean climate (Köppen climate classification: Csa) characterized with mild winters and hot summers. The rainiest season is the autumn, and the driest season is the summer. The sunshine hours are above 2,500.

History 
The first written reference to Comarruga appears in 1180, when the abbot of Sant Cugat granted to Arnau Sunyer i Berenguer the place named "ipsum vilare de Coma Ruga", near the castles of Calders and Saint Vincent.  The concession didn't grant the property of the pond of Comarruga, which belonged to the Monastery of Sant Cugat.

In 1183 the abbot of the Monastery of Sant Cugat granted additional rights in favour of Bernat de Papiol who accepted the compromise of guarding and defending the properties of the monastery and its inhabitants.

In 1887 the train station of Sant Vicenç de Calders was built within the lands of Comarruga.  During the 20th century, this train station became one of the most important railway intersections in Catalonia.  Due to this reason, a small neighborhood developed around it, mostly of railway workers and its families.  During the Spanish Civil War, this station was attacked several times by the fascist army of General Franco.  Thanks to the collaboration of Italian airplanes (hydroplanes) during the Christmas holidays of 1938 (between the 25th and the 29th), Comarruga was heavily bombed causing dozens of casualties.

In 1892 the hot springs of the  pond and small creek (riuet) of Comarruga were declared of public interest for its health properties by the Royal Academy of Medicine and Surgery of Barcelona.  In 1920 a Hotel and Spa was built near the pond.  This started the urban development of Comarruga which later in the 1960s and 1970s would become an important tourist town.

Demography

Population 
In 2015 the population of Comarruga was 4,074.

Languages 
The two official languages are Spanish and Catalan. The regional and local governments almost exclusively use Catalan and public signs are usually written in this language. Spanish is the language of business and the most commonly spoken language among residents and visitors.

Most young people have some knowledge of English. People working in the tourism industry may also speak other languages (French, Dutch, Russian, etc.).

Religion 
There is a Roman Catholic church, built in 1956-57. Masses are offered in Spanish and Catalan.

Infrastructure

Transportation 
 Barcelona–El Prat Airport is located 56 km to the east of Comarruga. There is a train connection from Sant Vicenç de Calders station, through Barcelona-Sants every 30 minutes.
 Comarruga's railway station (the official name is Sant Vicenç de Calders) is mostly used by commuter trains. Most of the day there are 3 trains per hour to Barcelona and 1-2 to Tarragona (2017). 
 Camp de Tarragona railway station, at 33 km to the west. It is used by the high-speed trains (AVE) Barcelona-Madrid. There are eleven connections per day (2017).
 Comarruga is served by three motorways: AP-2 (El Vendrell-Zaragoza, and then to Madrid), AP-7 (French border-Vera) and C-32 (Autopista Pau Casals), to Barcelona–El Prat Airport and Barcelona along the coast.

Healthcare 
 The nearest hospital (Hospital Comarcal del Vendrell) is located at El Vendrell, 8 km to the northeast.

Tourism

Tourist Information 
 The Tourist Information Office is located at Av. Brisamar, 1 (Coords: N 41º 10. 952' E 001º 31. 319').

Nearby attractions 
 Vil·la Casals, the house-museum of cellist Pau Casals. 2.5 km to the east.
 Arc de Berà. Roman, 1st century BC. 6.6 km to the west.
 Scipions Tower. Roman, 1st century BC. 21 km to the west.
 Les Ferreres Aqueduct, also known as Devil's Bridge. Roman, probably from the reign of Augustus (27 BC–14 AD). 30 km to the west.
 Tarragona. The Roman ruins of Tarraco (old name of Tarragona) have been designated a World Heritage Site by UNESCO. Another interesting building is the Cathedral, dating to the 12th-13th centuries and combining Romanesque and Gothic architectural elements. 31 km to the west.
 Santes Creus Monastery. Gothic style, 12th-13th century. 35 km to the northwest.

Marina 
 The Comarruga Marina was built in 1976 and is managed by the Club Nàutic Coma-ruga.

Photo Gallery

External links 
 Our Beaches (El Vendrell Tourist Information Office)
 Vil·la Museu Pau Casals.
 Rodalies de Catalunya. Information on the commuter rail service.

References 

Populated places in Baix Penedès